"Catch a Fire" is a song by Trinidadian-German musician Haddaway, released on July 31, 1995 as the second single from his second studio album, The Drive (1995). It is written by Dee Dee Halligan, Richard W. Palmer-James and Junior Torello, and produced by Halligan and Torello. The song was the last major Haddaway hit in several countries, particularly in Israel, Belgium (Flanders), where it reached the top 10. It also peaked at number 12 in Finland and number 17 in the Netherlands. On the Eurochart Hot 100, it reached number 43. For the first time, a Haddaway song was not released in France.

Critical reception
AllMusic editor Jose F. Promis viewed "Catch a Fire" as a "fantastic, urgent, anthemic" song, adding that it "definitely deserved some form of exposure in the U.S.". James Masterton for Dotmusic described it as "a typically bouncy piece of Europop but not one it seems that is going to find chart success to match past hits such as What Is Love and I Miss You." A reviewer from Music Week rated it three out of five, writing that "Haddaway continues to make the pop game look easy with another manfully-sung sun 'n' surf stomper ripe for picking by Club Medders." James Hamilton from the magazine's RM Dance Update called it a "huskily crooned Euro canterer".

Music video
A music video was produced to promote the single. It was later published on YouTube in October 2012. The video has amassed more than 822,000 views as of September 2021.

Track listings
 CD single
 "Catch a Fire" (Radio Edit) — 4:15
 "Catch a Fire" (Extended Version) — 5:56

 CD maxi
 "Catch a Fire" (Radio Edit) — 4:15
 "Catch a Fire" (Extended Version) — 5:56
 "Catch a Fire" (Catania's Maxi Version) — 5:36
 "Catch a Fire" (House Mix) — 6:25

Charts

Weekly charts

Year-end charts

References

1995 singles
1995 songs
Haddaway songs
Eurodance songs
House music songs
Songs written by Richard Palmer-James
Songs written by Tony Hendrik
English-language German songs